Ihlas Bebou (born 23 April 1994) is a Togolese professional footballer who plays as a striker or winger for Bundesliga club 1899 Hoffenheim and the Togo national team.

Club career
Bebou started playing football at Garather SV and VfB Hilden before joining Fortuna Düsseldorf in 2011. In December 2016 and June 2017, he rejected contract extensions with his current contract running out in 2018.

On 31 August 2017, the last day of the German summer transfer window, Bebou joined Bundesliga side Hannover.

On 16 May 2019 it was confirmed, that Bebou would join Hoffenheim from the upcoming season. Bebou penned a 3-year contract.

International career
Bebou debuted for the Togo national football team in a 5–0 win over Djibouti on 4 September 2016.

Career statistics

International
Scores and results list Togo's goal tally first.

References

External links
 
 Kicker Profile

Living people
1994 births
People from Sokodé
Association football forwards
Togolese footballers
Togo international footballers
Togolese expatriate footballers
Fortuna Düsseldorf II players
Fortuna Düsseldorf players
Hannover 96 players
TSG 1899 Hoffenheim players
2. Bundesliga players
Bundesliga players
Togolese expatriate sportspeople in Germany
Expatriate footballers in Germany
2017 Africa Cup of Nations players
21st-century Togolese people